Ryan Harper (born 1977) is a chess player from Port of Spain, Trinidad and Tobago. Harper is a nine time Trinidad and Tobago Chess Championship National Champion.

He is a FIDE Master (FM).   Harper is the top-ranked chess player in his country.

He has won several chess competitions locally and a number of competitions abroad.

He achieved his highest rating of 2309 in January 2018 maintaining his top ranking in Trinidad and Tobago.

References

Further reading
 Harper crushes GM at Olympiad, Guardian Trinidad&Tobago, 6 September 2012

External links
 
 
 
 
 MEN'S CHESS OLYMPIADS, Olimpbase
 FM Harper defends the title, The Chessdrum
 FM Ryan Harper, The Chessdrum

1977 births
Living people
Trinidad and Tobago chess players
Chess FIDE Masters